Mount Cumnock is a  mountain summit located in Jasper National Park of Alberta, Canada. It is situated in the De Smet Range of the Canadian Rockies. Mount Cumnock was named in 1916 by Morrison P. Bridgland after Cumnock, in Scotland. Bridgland (1878-1948) was a Dominion Land Surveyor who named many peaks in Jasper Park and the Canadian Rockies. The mountain's name was officially adopted in 1956 by the Geographical Names Board of Canada. Its nearest higher peak is Mount Haultain,  to the west. 


Climate
Based on the Köppen climate classification, Mount Cumnock is located in a subarctic climate with cold, snowy winters, and mild summers.

See also
 Geography of Alberta
 Geology of the Rocky Mountains

References

External links
 Mount Cumnock photo Flickr
 Parks Canada web site: Jasper National Park

Cumnock
Cumnock
Cumnock